Chung Kuo, Cina ("Zhongguo, China") is a 1972 Italian documentary directed by Michelangelo Antonioni. Antonioni was invited to China by its government to film the documentary, but the result was subsequently attacked as slanderous by Chinese authorities and the Italian Communist Party. It primarily observes the lives of contemporary working class Chinese people.

References

Further reading
 Rey Chow. China as documentary: Some basic questions (inspired by Michelangelo Antonioni and Jia Zhangke. European Journal of Cultural Studies. 2014, 17, 16–30. doi:10.1177/1367549413501482

External links

Chung Kuo, Cina with English subtitles at YouTube

1970s Italian-language films
Documentary films about China
1972 films
Films directed by Michelangelo Antonioni
Italian documentary films
1972 documentary films
Mandarin-language films
1970s Italian films